The Battle of the Nervasos Mountains (Spanish: Batalla de los Montes Nervasos) occurred in the year 419 and was fought between a coalition of Suebi, led by King Hermeric together with allied Roman Imperial forces stationed in the Province of Hispania, against the combined forces of the Vandals and Alans who were led by their King Gunderic. This battle occurred in the context of a contemporary Germanic invasion of the Iberian Peninsula. The battle took place in what is today the Province of León, Spain, and resulted in a Roman/Suebian Victory.

Context 
Between the years 409 and 411, the Germanic peoples of the Vandals and the Suebi, similarly like the Iranian Alans, migrated into the Iberian Peninsula via the Pyrenees Mountains after having already conquered the Gallo-Roman province of Gaul and subjected it to a three-year system of plunder and pillage. Seeing that the forces of the Western Roman Empire were unable to effectively respond to new threats due to local uprisings led by Maximus of Hispania and Gerontius, the Germanic tribes saw an opportunity to invade the peninsula and carve out territory for themselves, starting the period of the Germanic Invasion of Iberia.

The invaders divided amongst themselves, the territories of Hispania, taking the whole of Hispania Tarraconensis from the Romans without encountering any significant opposition. The Silingi Vandals gained control over the Roman province of Hispania Baetica, the Alans took over administration of Lusitania and Hispania Carthaginensis, whilst the Suebi and the Hasdingi Vandals took over Gallaecia. The Suebi continued on with the original Roman Conventus iuridicus Lucense, maintaining a capital in Lucus Augusti (Lugo), and with the Bracarense with its capital at Bracara Augusta (Braga). The Hasdingi Vandals likewise maintained the Roman structure dating back from the Augustan and Claudian emperors. Their Roman Conventus Asturicensus maintained its capital at Asturica Augusta, (Astorga).

In 416, Wallia, King of the Visigothic Kingdom of Toulouse, entered the Iberian Peninsula as a Roman general to fight the invading barbarian tribes. The Germanic tribes were unable to unite against their common enemy and by 418, the Silingi Vandals had been almost completely annihilated and the Alans were dispersed after the fighting death of their king, Attaces.  The survivors of these groups sheltered themselves with the Hasdingi Vandals (From that moment on, the Vandal kings were known in title as King of the Vandals and the Alans).

The King of the Suebi, Hermeric, for his part, was able to sign a treaty with the Emperor Honorius, gaining his tribe the legal status of Foederati (a status also held by the Visigoths), for which the Hispano-Romans were obliged to cede them land. They established a garrison at Braga which began to emerge as a center of power.  The disgrace felt by the Hispano-Romans at having to cede their lands to the Suebi would be felt painfully in the future during the conflicts between the natives and the colonizers.  The following periods would be marked with failed peace treaties and even the sending of a native embassy to solicit the help of the Gallo-Roman general Flavius Aetius by Bishop Hydatius that would also end in failure.

In his alliance with the Romans, Hermeric was swayed by the expansionist desires of his kingdom and would enter into conflict with his neighboring Vandals, the closest other German tribe occupying Hispania.

The battle
The details of the confrontation between the two tribes are not clear, but it is possible to deduce that it was the Suebi who took the initiative in commencing hostilities seeing as the Nervasos Mountains (named for either the ancient Narbasi people or for the Roman General Erbasius), due to their imprecise location, could have been situated in the region of El Bierzo in today's Province of Leon, then the conventus iuridicus asturicensis, which under the pact of 409-411, belonged to the Hasdingi Vandals under Gunderic.

During the invasion of the Vandal lands, Hermeric and his army are surrounded in the Nervasos Mountains by the forces of Gunderic, only being saved from a disastrous defeat by timely Roman intervention. The Roman comes Hispaniarum, Asterius, at the head of a powerful Roman army, lifted the Suebi siege and obliged the Vandals to retreat. The Roman campaign continued and Asterius obliged the Vandals to retreat south to Bracara Augusta, where he had pre-arranged a pincer movement together with his vicarius, Maurocellus, who commanded another sizable Roman force. They intercepted the Hasdingi Vandals and routed them.

Consequences 
Having been defeated, king Gunderic guided his tribe in search of new settlement in Hispania Baetica. Between 421 and 422, they routed the imperial army of General Castinus who was sent to reconquer former Roman lands in that area. The Vandals built a grand fleet which they used to gain naval dominance in the region and were able to conquer a large portion of southeastern Spain, sacking the cities of Carthago Nova and Hispalis amongst others.

In 428, Gunderic died. He is succeeded to the throne by his half brother Genseric, who decided that best place for his people to settle would be North Africa, which was being ravaged by internal disputes which would nullify the Roman resistance. Genseric began preparations to cross the Straits of Gibraltar with over 80,000 people, 15,000 of whom were warriors, however he was attacked from the rear by a large force of Suebi under the command of Heremigarius who had managed to take Lusitania. This Suebi army was defeated near Mérida and its leader Hermigario drowned in the Guadiana River while trying to flee. The following year, the Vandals disembarked in Ceuta, from which in a few years they would control all of Roman North Africa before being conquered by Belisarius, a general of Justinian I.

The Suebi would remain in Gallaecia until their conquest by the Visigoths under Liuvigild in the year 585.

See also 
 List of Roman battles
 Decline of the Western Roman Empire

References

Bibliography 
 

419
410s conflicts
Theodosian dynasty
Battles involving the Roman Empire
Nervasos Mountains
Battles involving Germanic peoples
Battles involving the Vandals
Nervasos Mountains
5th century in Hispania
410s in the Roman Empire
Kingdom of the Suebi
History of the province of León